Hassan II (612) is a  of the Royal Moroccan Navy. The ship was the first to be constructed for Morocco by Chantiers de l'Atlantique at Saint-Nazaire, France, from 1999 to 2002. The frigate entered service in 2002. Hassan II is the second of two Floréal-class frigates in Moroccan service, the other being .

Design and description
The s were designed in response to a demand for a cheap warship capable of operating in low threat areas and able to perform general patrol functions. As a result, the Floréal class were constructed to mercantile standards in the areas of ammunition stowage, helicopter facilities and damage control, which significantly lowered the cost of the vessels. The Floréal class were designed for using modular construction which shortened their building times. The Moroccan frigates of the class are similar to those in French service with a few changes.

Due to the frigate's broad beam, the ship is equipped with fin stabilisers.

The frigate is powered by a combined diesel and diesel (CODAD) system comprising four SEMT Pielstick 6 PA6 L280 BPC diesel engines driving two shafts each turning a LIPS controllable pitch propeller. The CODAD system is rated at  The vessel is also equipped with one  bow thruster. Due to the mercantile construction design, the four diesels are all located within one machinery room for ease of maintenance. Both diesel fuel and TR5 aviation fuel is brought aboard at a single location at the stern compared to naval-constructed vessels which sport two. The ship also has three  diesel-electric generators located just fore and aft of the machinery room.

Hassan II is armed with two Exocet MM38 surface-to-surface missiles in launchers situated centrally atop the midships superstructure. The ship also mounts one Otobreda  gun turret with Najir fire control system located forwards. The vessel is capable of being armed with two 20 mm modèle F2 guns situated in atop the aft superstructure. In place of the  guns, the Moroccan Floréal-class frigates can be fitted with twin launchers for Simbad surface-to-air missiles. The ship is equipped with two Decca Bridgemaster radars, one for use as navigational radar, the other for helicopter control, Thomsen-CSF ARBR 17 radar intercept electronic surveillance systems and two Dagaie decoy systems. 

The frigate is equipped with a  helicopter landing pad located on the stern and a  hangar. The ship is capable of operating the embarked Eurocopter AS565 Panther up to sea state 5. Hassan II is capable of operating helicopters up to the size of the Eurocopter AS332 Super Puma. The ship has a complement of 89 including officers.

Construction and career
Hassan II was ordered as the second of a pair of Floréal-class frigates on 12 July 1999 from Chantiers de l'Atlantique for construction at their yard in Saint-Nazaire, France. The vessel's keel was laid down in December 1999 and was built using modular construction methods which reduced the ship's construction time. Hassan II was launched on 11 February 2002 and commissioned into the Royal Moroccan Navy on 20 December 2002.

Beginning in September 2013, the frigate underwent a six-week refit at the Portuguese shipyard ALFEITE. In 2014, Hassan II trained with United States Navy vessels in the Mediterranean Sea as part of Operation Phoenix Express. In 2018, the ship took part in the international joint naval exercise Neptune Trident, operating alongside the Royal Canadian Navy in the Gulf of Guinea. In 2019, Hassan II and the corvette  were deployed to multiple European ports to train with European navies, stopping in the Netherlands, France and Germany.

Citations

References

External links

Floréal-class frigates
2002 ships
Frigates of the Royal Moroccan Navy